The 2013–14 I-League (known as the Airtel I-League for sponsorship reasons) was the seventh season of the I-League, the top-tier Indian professional league for football clubs, since its establishment in 2007. The season began on 21 September 2013, and ended on 28 April 2014.

Churchill Brothers were the defending champions, having won their second I-League title in the previous season.

On 21 April 2014, Bengaluru FC were crowned champions with one game remaining, winning their first ever I-League title by defeating Dempo 2–4 at Fatorda Stadium. Bengaluru FC also created history by becoming the first team ever to win the I-League title in its debut season. On 28 April 2014, Mohammedan were relegated from the I-League when Churchill Brothers defeated Salgaocar 2–1, and hence survived relegation. Churchill Brothers also avoided being the first defending champions to be relegated.

During the season, Maria Rebello became the first woman referee internationally to officiate in a country's premier league match when she officiated in Pune vs Shillong Lajong on 8 March 2014.

Teams
A total of 13 teams are currently registered to start the new season. Ten clubs from the previous campaign, two promoted sides from the 2013 I-League 2nd Division and one new expansion team.

Rangdajied United as champions and Mohammedan as runners-up secured direct promotion from the 2nd Division.

United Sikkim and Air India were relegated, although Air India would not have been given a licence to compete in this edition after failing to fulfill the AIFF criteria. This same fate happened to ONGC who have also been left out of the coming season.

Mumbai Tigers was accepted into the league on 27 May 2013 but later withdrew citing unavoidable circumstances with only 20 days left into the start of the new season.

Bengaluru was also accepted into the league and is based in Bangalore. One other consortium from Kerala, whose leading company is Eagles FC, also expressed interest in joining the league. It was also announced in late May that English club Queens Park Rangers also expressed interest but look to be prepared to enter for the 2014–15 season.

On 29 August 2013, the AIFF decided to shut down Pailan Arrows and withdraw them from the coming season. The league committee also announced in May 2013 to use a Conference Model, the Eastern Conference and Western Conference. The top-four from each Conference would advance to play the final round. But this was later dropped.

On 20 September 2013, it was announced that the largest cellular service provider in India, Airtel, will be the title sponsor of I-League for the 2013–14 season.

Venues and locations

Personnel and kits

1. On the back of shirt.
2. On the sleeves.

Transfers

Managerial changes

1.  Rangdajied United, during the 2013 I-League 2nd Division, were under the control of their General Secretary, Karsing Kurbah.

Foreign players
Restricting the number of foreign players strictly to four per team, including a slot for a player from AFC countries. A team could use four foreign players on the field during each game including at least one player from the AFC country.

 Foreign players who left their clubs midway or after first half of the season.

League table

Results

Season statistics

Top scorers

Top Indian Scorers

Hat-tricks

4 Player scored 4 goals

Disciplinary
  Most red cards (2)
 Echezona Anyichie (Mohun Bagan)
 Amrinder Singh (Pune)
  Most yellow cards (7)
 Eric Brown (United SC)
 Yohei Iwasaki (Rangdajied United)
 Luciano Sabrosa (Mohammedan)
 Lamine Tamba (Rangdajied United)
   Worst disciplinary record (2 red cards & 5 yellow cards)
 Echezona Anyichie (Mohun Bagan)

Fair play
The Fair Play qualities of the participating teams and which are pertinent to the spectators will be evaluated using the FIFA Fair Play evaluation form. Salgaocar led the Fair Play rankings at the end of the season.

Average attendance
Average attendance at the various clubs were as follows:

Awards

AIFF Awards
All India Football Federation awarded the following awards for the I-League season, voted by all the captains and the coaches of all the participating clubs.
 Best player of I-League: Sunil Chhetri (Bengaluru FC)
 Best goalkeeper of I-League: Karanjit Singh (Salgaocar)
 Best defender of I-League: John Johnson (Bengaluru FC)
 Best midfielder of I-League: Douhou Pierre (Pune)
 Best forward of I-League: Sunil Chhetri (Bengaluru FC)
 Best referee of I-League: Pratap Singh
 Best assistant referee of I-League: Sapan Kennedy

FPAI Awards
Football Player's Association of India awarded the following award for the season
 Indian player of the year :  Balwant Singh
 Coach of the season :  Ashley Westwood
 Young player of the season :  Alwyn George
 Foreign player of the season :  Daryl Duffy
 Fans player of the season :  Boithang Haokip

Number of teams by state

References

 
I-League seasons
1
India